The National Parks Development Committee (NPDC) is an agency of the Department of Tourism of the Philippines that is mandated to develop, preserve, and manage Rizal and Paco Parks in Manila and other parks that may be assigned to it. Its main office is located in the Old Planetarium Building, P. Burgos Drive, Rizal Park, Luneta, Manila. Both the Executive Director and the Deputy Executive Director are appointed by the President of the Philippines.

Managed sites

Current
Rizal Park, Manila
Paco Park, Manila

Former
 Quezon Memorial Circle, Quezon City
 Burnham Park, Baguio
 Fort Santiago, Intramuros, Manila
 Pook ni Maria Makiling Forest Park, Los Baños, Laguna
 Mabini Shrine, Manila
 Plaza Olivia Salamanca, Manila

Board of Directors
 Chair: Secretary, Department of Tourism
 Vice Chair: Executive Director, National Parks Development Committee
 Director: Mayor, City of Manila
 Director: COO, Tourism Promotions Board
 Director: COO, Tourism Infrastructure and Enterprise Zone Authority
 Director: Administrator, Intramuros Administration
 Director: Secretary, Department of Public Works and Highways

References

Historic preservation organizations in the Philippines
Department of Tourism (Philippines)